Two ships in the United States Navy have been named USS Macedonian. 

 The first  was a 38-gun sailing frigate, originally  of the Royal Navy, captured by Stephen Decatur in the War of 1812.
 The second  was rebuilt from the keel of the first Macedonian and placed in service in 1836.

United States Navy ship names